Ellen Perez and Arina Rodionova were the defending champions, but chose not to participate.

Haruka Kaji and Junri Namigata won the title, defeating Quinn Gleason and Ingrid Neel in the final, 7–6(7–5), 5–7, [10–8].

Seeds

Draw

Draw

References

External Links
Main Draw

Challenger Banque Nationale de Granby - Doubles
Challenger de Granby